Léopold de Wenzel (23 January 1847 – 21 August 1923), also known as Leopold Wenzel, was an Italian conductor and composer.

Born in Naples, Wenzel spent most of his career working in London, with the exception of some years spent in Paris. Wenzel was appointed as musical director, music arranger and ballet composer at the Empire Theatre of Varieties in London in 1889, where he wrote and arranged numerous ballets.  Later, he conducted at the Gaiety Theatre, London until 1913. In addition to ballets, his many works include art songs, orchestral works, and operas in the late Victorian era and early Edwardian period.  He also composed songs that were incorporated into some works of musical theatre.  He died in Asnières, near Paris.

Selected works
Ballets with choreographer Katti Lanner at the Empire
A Dream of Wealth (1889)
Cécile (1890)
Dolly (1890)
Orfeo (1891)
By the Sea (1891)
Nisita (1891)
Versailles (1892)
Round the Town (1892)
Katrina (1893)
The Girl I Left Behind Me (1893)
Brighton (Paris Olympia music hall)
Monte Cristo (1896)
Under One Flag (1897)
The Press (1898)
Alaska (1898)
Round the Town Again6 (1899)
Sea-Side (1900)
Les Papillons (1901)
Old China (1901)
Our Crown (1902)
The Milliner Duchess (1903)
Vineland (1903)
High Jinks (1904)

Operas
Le Chevalier Mignon (1884, Paris)
L'Élève du Conservatoire (1894, Paris)

Other Works
Cinder Ellen up too late (1891), a burlesque on the fairy tale Cinderella (additional numbers)
An Artist's Model, an Edwardian musical comedy (1895) (additional numbers)

Notes

References
Guest, Ivor. The Empire Ballet (1962) London:Society for Theatre Research

1847 births
1923 deaths
Italian opera composers
Male opera composers
Italian classical composers
Italian male classical composers
English classical composers
19th-century Italian musicians
19th-century Italian male musicians